William A. Gwatney (August 26, 1959 – August 13, 2008) was an American politician who served as the State Chair of the Democratic Party of Arkansas. He had previously served as a State Senator for ten years and as the financial chair of Mike Beebe's campaign for Governor of Arkansas in 2006. Gwatney was selected as a superdelegate at the 2008 Democratic National Convention, but was assassinated before the convention.

Death 
On August 13, 2008, Gwatney was killed by Timothy Dale Johnson, who entered Democratic Party headquarters in Little Rock, Arkansas, and shot Gwatney three times. Gwatney was taken to a hospital, but died later that day.

The gunman had said he wanted to speak with Gwatney about volunteering, but sidestepped his assistant when she said he was busy. After the shooting, the gunman fled the scene in his truck and led police on a  chase out of Little Rock. Johnson was killed by police after a PIT maneuver forced him off the road into a field near Sheridan. No motive was discovered, except Johnson quitting his job at a Target retail store earlier that day.

Honors 
The University of Arkansas at Little Rock (UALR) Athletic Department posthumously inducted Gwatney into their Hall of Fame during a ceremony prior to the tip-off of the men's basketball game vs. New Orleans on February 26, 2009.

See also 
 List of assassinated American politicians
 List of superdelegates at the 2008 Democratic National Convention
 2011 Tucson shooting

References

External links 

 Democratic Party of Arkansas

1959 births
2008 deaths
2008 murders in the United States
20th-century American politicians
American automobile salespeople
Arkansas Democratic state chairmen
Arkansas state senators
Assassinated American politicians
Businesspeople from Arkansas
Deaths by firearm in Arkansas
People murdered in Arkansas
20th-century American businesspeople
Assassinated American former and incumbent party officials